Biberist Ost railway station is a railway station in the municipality of Biberist, in the Swiss canton of Solothurn. It is an intermediate stop on the standard gauge Solothurn–Langnau line of BLS AG. The station is located on the east side of the Emme, opposite the Biberist city center.

Services 
The following services stop at Biberist Ost:

References

External links 
 
 

Railway stations in the canton of Solothurn
BLS railway stations